Live in Europe is a live Curtis Mayfield album released in 1988.

Track listing
All tracks composed by Curtis Mayfield; except where indicated

 Introduction
 “Ice 9”
 “Back to the World”
 “It's Alright”/”Amen”
 “Gypsy Woman”
 “Freddie's Dead”
 “Pusherman”
 “We've Gotta Have Peace”
 “We've Only Just Begun” (Paul Williams, Roger Nichols)
 “People Get Ready”
 “Move On Up”
 "(Don't Worry) If There's a Hell Below, We're All Going to Go"
 “When Seasons Change”

Personnel
Curtis Mayfield – vocals, guitar, "music coloring"
Joseph Scott, Lebron Scott – bass
Buzz Amato – keyboards
Lee Goodness - drums
Master Henry Gibson – percussion
Technical
Carlos Glover - engineer

Curtis Mayfield live albums
1987 live albums
Albums produced by Curtis Mayfield
Curtom Records live albums